Donna Day Baird is an American epidemiologist and evolutionary-population biologist. She is a senior investigator at the National Institute of Environmental Health Sciences.

Early career and education 
Baird completed a bachelor of arts in biology, Phi Beta Kappa, at Macalester College in 1968. From 1968 to 1969, she was a laboratory technician in the department of anatomy at University of Minnesota (UMN). Baird was a research analyst for the American Rehabilitation Foundation from 1969 to 1972. She was a research and teaching assistant in the department of ecology at UMN from 1972 to 1976.

Baird was trained as an evolutionary/population biologist in the Ecology Department at UMN. From 1978 to 1979, Baird was an instructor in the departments of ecology and anthropology at UMN. She earned a Ph.D. in evolutionary ecology from UMN in 1980. Her dissertation was titled Dispersal in Microtus pennsylvanicus. In 1980, Baird was a post-doctoral fellow at the Northern Illinois University Center for Biopolitical Research. From 1981 to 1982, Baird was a staff associate for biological sciences curriculum study in Boulder, Colorado. In 1983, she was a graduate teaching assistant in the department of epidemiology at University of North Carolina at Chapel Hill.

Baird's post-doctoral work at the University of North Carolina provided the opportunity for train in reproductive epidemiology. She earned a M.P.H. in epidemiology from University of North Carolina in 1984. Her thesis was titled Cholesterol change during menopause.

Career 
Baird joined the National Institute of Environmental Health Sciences (NIEHS) in 1984 as a senior staff fellow. In 1990, she became an epidemiologist, senior investigator, and principal investigator. At NIEHS, Baird began by studying fertility and developing epidemiologic methods for studying it. She has longstanding interest in hormones and fertility as well as early pregnancy events (implantation, corpus luteum rescue, the luteal placental shift in support of the pregnancy, as well as pregnancy complications and pregnancy outcomes). More recently, Baird developed a research program in uterine fibroid epidemiology. She mentors people at all levels.

Research 
Baird's research has focused on women's reproductive health, especially understudied conditions. In addition to research in specific content areas, she is interested in developing new methodologies including techniques for data collection and analysis.

Awards and honors 
In 2010, Baird was elected to the American Epidemiological Society.

References 

Living people
Year of birth missing (living people)
Macalester College alumni
University of Minnesota alumni
UNC Gillings School of Global Public Health alumni
National Institutes of Health people
20th-century American biologists
21st-century American women scientists
20th-century American women scientists
21st-century American biologists
American women biologists
American women epidemiologists
American epidemiologists
Evolutionary biologists